Run Dusty Run (foaled April 19, 1974) is an American Thoroughbred racehorse, winner of the 1976 Arlington-Washington Futurity Stakes.

Career

Run Dusty Run began his racing career on April 6, 1976, placing 4th at Keeneland.

As a two-year-old he picked up two wins in Arlington in September and October 1976 before winning the Grade 1 Arlington-Washington Futurity Stakes, the first major win of his career. On October 9, 1976, he won the Grade 2 Breeders' Futurity Stakes, then finished the year with a win in the Kentucky Jockey Club Stakes.

Run Dusty Run's three-year-old campaign was a tough one. He finished second six times. In Seattle Slew's 1977 U.S. Triple Crown year, Run Dusty Run finished second in the 1977 Kentucky Derby, third in the 1977 Preakness Stakes and second in the 1977 Belmont Stakes.

1978 was Dusty's last racing year and he finished his career with wins at the Hialeah Challenge Cup Invitational Stakes and the Grade 2 Seminole Stakes.

Pedigree

References

1974 racehorse births